I Want Candy is a compilation album by English new wave band Bow Wow Wow, released in May 1982 by RCA Records. Side one of the album consists of all four tracks from Bow Wow Wow's EP The Last of the Mohicans, and the band's recent hit "Baby, Oh No"; these tracks were produced by Kenny Laguna of Joan Jett & the Blackhearts fame. Side two consists of four tracks from Bow Wow Wow's debut album See Jungle! See Jungle! Go Join Your Gang Yeah, City All Over! Go Ape Crazy!, and "El Boss Dicho", the B-side to the single "Go Wild in the Country".

Though RCA had previously issued The Last of the Mohicans in the United States, the label wished to release a full-length album to capitalize on the American success of the music video for the band's single "I Want Candy" on MTV. I Want Candy peaked at number 123 on the US Billboard 200.

The cover photograph, a nude image of lead singer Annabella Lwin painted gold, was taken by Jim Varriale. The photograph was later reversed for the cover of the 2008 compilation album Love, Peace & Harmony – The Best of Bow Wow Wow.

I Want Candy is also the name of the UK edition of EMI's compilation of the band, Twelve Original Recordings which reached 26 on the UK album chart, as well as 2003 two-disc Bow Wow Wow anthology from Castle Music's Sanctuary Records, and a 2007 three-track EP on Cleopatra Records, which also contained a cover of the Smiths' "I Started Something I Couldn't Finish".

Track listing

Notes

Charts

References

External links
 
 

1982 compilation albums
Bow Wow Wow albums
Albums produced by Colin Thurston
RCA Records compilation albums